Vigna is an Italian surname. Notable people with the surname include:

Albert Vigna (1891–1970), Monegasque racing cyclist
Arturo Vigna (1863–1927), Italian opera conductor
Benedetto Vigna (born 1969), Italian physicist and business executive
Elvira Vigna (1947–2017), Brazilian writer, illustrator, and journalist
Hernán Vigna (born 1977), former Argentine footballer
Giovanni Vigna (born ), Italian rugby league footballer who played in the 1950s and 1960s
Judith Vigna (1936–2019), English writer and painter
Laura Vigna (born 1999), Italian softball player
Marino Vigna (born 1938), retired Italian cyclist
Pierluigi Vigna (1933–2012), Italian judge
Sebastiano Vigna (born 1967), Italian professor of computer science
Tecla Vigna (died 1927), Italian opera singer

Italian-language surnames